Sewang is a traditional dance performed by the aboriginal Orang Asli people of Malaysia. Originally the dance was performed for funeral, for thanksgiving, or to treat the sick or wounded, and now it is also used to entertain foreign travelers. It involves dancing in a circle to music produced from bamboo.

References 

Orang Asli
Malaysian culture